Nicol Allan (1931–2019) was an American artist known for his paper collages.

Biography 

Nicol Allan was born in Los Angeles in 1931 of Scottish immigrant parents. His father worked as a streetcar conductor until his death of tuberculosis, soon after his son’s birth. Nicol Allan and his mother also contracted tuberculosis and he spent two years strapped flat on a Bradford frame after two spinal operations at the age of five. He then lived in a foster home for several years before returning to live with his family. 

Allan was entirely self-trained as an artist and he did not attend university other than one term at Los Angeles City College. However, he had a work accepted in an open national competition organized by the Los Angeles County Museum at the age of 19 and he spent the rest of his life work as an artist. In 1963, he married Sarah (Meyers) Allan. They lived where her career as a sinologist took them: California, the UK, and then the US again. He died in Hanover, New Hampshire in 2019. Although his work was exhibited in Los Angeles, New York, and London, and his work is in private and public collections, he lived reclusively and had little direct personal contact with the art world.

Artwork 

"The collages enter into dialogue with various strands of artistic modernism, from Braque and Picasso's papier collé to Malevich's Suprematism and Mondrian's De Stijl to American colour field painting. It is as if Allan had set himself the task of working through a number of formal problems in the history of abstraction and of making them new." - Rye Dag Holmboe

Allan’s main medium was paper collage, and he produced about 200 pieces. He also worked in sumi, wood reliefs, watercolours, and occasionally oils. His work is generally on a very small scale, the collages usually measuring less than twenty centimeters in height and fifteen centimeters in width. They are highly compressed and abstract in form; the artist described them as “an interpretation in simple form of inner states of mind.”  They nevertheless allude to the natural world and to human life, with repeated themes, such as  ‘rain’, ‘waves’, ‘sea’, ‘mountains’, ‘masks’, ‘heads’,  and ‘dancers’. As Andrew Hunt states, their compression “hints at its opposite: expanding celestial proportions…. His are pinpricks that disrupt and explode time and space.” Rye Holmboe says: “There is comfort to be found in an implied structure, to be sure, as in the continuity between art and nature, but the collages also intimate a more groundless and vertiginous dimension of experience. It is this ambiguity, more than any thematic content, that both motivates and lies at the heart of Allan’s paper poetics."

Exhibitions 
(Sources)
 1950 – "Survey of American Painting" – at the Los Angeles County Museum
 1952 – Artists of Los Angeles and Vicinity – at the Los Angeles County Museum
 1954 – Artists of Los Angeles and Vicinity – at the Los Angeles County Museum
 1959–60 – Solo exhibitions – at the Simone Gallery, Los Angeles
 1960s – Cober Gallery, New York
 1966 – Sylvan Simone Gallery, Los Angeles   
 1967 – Esther Bear Gallery, Santa Barbara
 1978 – The Parsons-Dreyfuss Gallery (Betty Parsons), New York
 1979 – Taranman Gallery, London
 1980 – The Parsons-Dreyfuss Gallery (Betty Parsons), New York
 1982 – Taranman Gallery, London
 1982 – Arts Club of Chicago 
 1990s – Davis and Langdale, New York
 2008 – "Nicol Allan: Collages", Davis & Langdale Company, 57th Street, New York, USA
 2009 – "Recent Acquisitions", Davis & Langdale Company, 57th Street, New York, USA
 2009 – "Nicol Allan: Recent Collages", Davis & Langdale Company, 57th Street, New York, USA
 2010 – "Nicol Allan", Davis & Langdale Company, 57th Street, New York, USA
 2012 – "5 Artists: On Paper", Davis & Langdale Company,57th Street, New York, USA
 2012 – "Group Exhibition", Davis & Langdale Company, 57th Street, New York, USA
 2015 – "Summer Exhibition", Davis & Langdale Company, 57th Street, New York, USA
 2017 – "Recent Contemporary Works", Davis & Langdale Company, 57th Street, New York, USA
 2017 – "Group Exhibition", Davis & Langdale Company, 57th Street, New York, USA
 2021 – "Nicol Allan: Collages" – at Laure Genillard Gallery, Fitzrovia, London, UK

Public holdings of Allan's work 
Nicol Allan's work is held by 
 the Arts Council of Great Britain
 the Art Institute of Chicago, 
 the Christopher Hewitt Collection at the Ashmolean Museum, Oxford
 the De Beers Art Collection, London
 the Hood Museum, Dartmouth College, Hanover, New Hampshire
 the ARoS Aarhus Kunstmuseum, Denmark

References

Further reading 
 The Insiders: Rejection And Rediscovery Of Man In The Arts Of Our Time by Selden Rodman (Louisiana State University Press, 1960)
 Nicol Allan, with a preface by Gerald Nordland (Taranman, London, 1982). ISBN 9780906499146
 Nicol Allan. Collages, ed. by Rye Dag Holmboe (Slimvolume, 2021)

External Links 
 Nicol Allan website
 Nicol Allan entry on artland.com
 Nicol Allan at the Art Institute of Chicago
 Nicol Allan at Arts Council Collection
 "Sensibility and Substance. Recent collages by Nicol Allan at Davis & Langdale", by Maureen Mullarkey (2009).

1931 births
2019 deaths
American artists
American people of Scottish descent
People from Los Angeles